Experience is the seventh studio album by Japanese rock band Rize, released on June 23, 2010. This is the first album Rize have released since guitarist Nakao Yoshihiro left the band in 2008.

Track listing
Jesus and Maria
Me
Experience
Laugh It Out 
Get The Mic
Gotanda
XL
Muppet
Yuzuriha
Middle Flower
Zero

External links
 http://www.triberize.net/index3.html
 Official YouTube channel dedicated to the album

Rize (band) albums
2010 albums